Saint Michael the Archangel Serbian Eastern Orthodox Church (Serbian: Српска православна црква Светог Архангела Михаила) in Toronto, Ontario, Canada is a Serbian Eastern Orthodox church which is not a member of the Serbian Orthodox Church due to a tumultuous history.

In 2008, the church was showcased in the annual Doors Open Toronto event.

History
The church structure was built in 1890 as an Anglican church. In 1964, it was bought by the Serbian Canadian community to serve as the city's second Serbian Orthodox church (the first being the Saint Sava Church in Cabbagetown). The church is located in Dovercourt Park on 212 Delaware Avenue just across the street from Ossington station. Stylistically, the church building synthesizes Serbian late-Byzantine architectural-styles and icon styles. It has many copper domes, cupolas and trim.

The reason a second church was sought was the 1963 schism where Serbs in North America, distraught that Patriarch German had relations with the League of Communists of Yugoslavia, formed the Free Serbian Orthodox Church which existed up until 1991 when newly-appointed Patriarch Pavle visited the United States and returned the church to full communion with the mother church in Belgrade. After this, the Saint Michael the Archangel Church was part of the canonical  from 1991 until June 2009.

In June 2009, the Serbian Orthodox Church in North and South America underwent reorganizing, transferring the Saint Michael the Archangel Church from the Eparchy for America and Canada to the Eparchy of Canada. Members of the Saint Michael the Archangel Church and School Congregation objected and as a result of this internal conflict, the parish was transferred out of the Serbian Orthodox jurisdiction and over to the non-canonical jurisdiction of the Orthodox Church of Greece (Holy Synod in Resistance) under the Archdiocese of Etna (California). The first Divine Liturgy under the new jurisdiction was on Sunday April 11, 2010.

In 2014, the year the parish celebrated its 50th anniversary, the Holy Synod in Resistance united itself with the Church of the Genuine Orthodox Christians of Greece and formally ceased to exist. This transferred the parish over to the Metropolis of the Genuine Greek Orthodox Church of America (Greek Old Calendarists). 

Since 2015, the parish is not part of any diocese and has been registered as a corporation. It is still sometimes referred to as a Free Serbian Orthodox Church.

See also
 Saint Petka Serbian Orthodox Church
 Serbian Orthodox Eparchy of Canada
 Holy Transfiguration Monastery
 Holy Trinity Serbian Orthodox Church (Montreal)
 Saint Sava Serbian Orthodox Church (Toronto)
 Saint Arsenije Sremac Serbian Orthodox Church
 All Serbian Saints Serbian Orthodox Church (Mississauga)
 Holy Trinity Serbian Orthodox Church (Regina)
 St. Stefan Serbian Orthodox Church (Ottawa)
 Saint Nicholas Serbian Orthodox Cathedral (Hamilton, Ontario)
 Holy Trinity Serbian Orthodox Church (Regina)
 Serbian Canadians

References

External links
 

Churches in Toronto
Eastern Orthodox church buildings in Canada
Church buildings with domes
Serbian-Canadian culture
Serbian Orthodox church buildings in Canada